Tasawar Hayat (born 1 January 1969) is a Pakistani mathematician who has made pioneering research contributions to the area of mathematical fluid mechanics. He is considered one of the leading mathematicians working in Pakistan and currently is a Professor of Mathematics at the Quaid-i-Azam University.

Biography
Born in Khanewal, Hayat received his early education from there. He is an alumnus of University of Islamabad, better known as Quaid-i-Azam University, where he received BSc in mathematics in 1988. With his bachelor's degree, he secured a silver medal awarded by the university's board of graduation. He completed his M.Phil. in 1994, followed by the MSc in mathematics in 1992 and a PhD in mathematics, under the supervision of Dr. Saleem Asghar in 1999 from the same institution.

Having joined Quaid-i-Azam University as a junior research assistant, Hayat engaged his research in wave mechanics, Fluid mechanics, and non-Newtonian fluid mechanics. He became a senior research assistant in 1995, and a lecturer in mathematics in 1998. In 2001, he went to Germany where he became an AVH Fellow at the Technische Universität Darmstadt.

After completing his research, Hayat returned to Pakistan, where he joined his alma mater to become an assistant professor of mathematical sciences. In 2005, he was promoted as an associate professor in mathematics department of Quaid-i-Azam University (QAU) and, in 2007, had promoted as a distinguished HEC National Professor.

His research is engaged to the fields of Wave Motion, Acoustic, Electromagnetic and Elastic waves, Fluid Mechanics, Relativity, and Biomechanics. At QAU, he is a distinguished member of Fluid Mechanics Group, where he is currently supervising the postgraduate studies.

Awards and honours
 Hilal-e-Imtiaz Government of Pakistan, Arif Alvi, 2019
 Tamgha-i-Imtiaz, Sitara-i-Imtiaz, Government of Pakistan, 2005.
 M. Raziuddin Siddiqi Gold Medal, Pakistan Academy of Sciences, 1999
 Abdus Salam Award in Mathematics, 1999
 TWAS Young Scientist Award, 2000
 Silver Medal in BSc, 1988
 Gold Medal (Mathematics), Pakistan Academy of Sciences, 2006
 17th Khwarizmi International Award, Govt of Iran, 2004
 ISESCO International Prize, 2004.
 Distinguished National Professor of Higher Education Commission (HEC) (2007).
 Awarded PAS Gold Medal by the Pakistan Academy of Sciences (2006)
 Fellow of Pakistan Academy of Sciences (2006).
 Best University Teacher Award (2005) awarded by the Higher Education Commission (HEC).

Publications
 T. Hayat and M. Awais, Three-dimensional flow of upper convected Maxwell (UCM) fluid over a stretching surface, Int. J. Numerical Methods Fluids, (2010)
 Peristaltic motion of a Burger's fluid in a planar channel. Tasawar Hayat, Nasir Ali, Saleem Asghar, Applied Mathematics and Computation. (2007)
 A mathematical description of peristaltic hydromagnetic flow in a tube. Tasawar Hayat, Nasir Ali: Applied Mathematics and Computation.(2007)
  Peristaltic motion of a Carreau fluid in an asymmetric channel. Nasir Ali, Tasawar Hayat: Applied Mathematics and Computation 193. (2007)
  Exact peristaltic flow in tubes with an endoscope. Tasawar Hayat, Nasir Ali, Saleem Asghar, A. M. Siddiqui: Applied Mathematics and Computation. (2006)
 Rotating flow of a third grade fluid by homotopy analysis method. Saleem Asghar, M. Mudassar Gulzar, Tasawar Hayat:Applied Mathematics and Computation. (2005)
 An oscillating hydromagnetic non-Newtonian flow in a rotating system. Tasawar Hayat, S. Nadeem, A. M. Siddiqui, Saleem Asghar: Appl. Math. Lett.  (2004)
 Magnetohydrodynamic flow of an Oldroyd 6-constant fluid. Tasawar Hayat, Masood Khan, Saleem Asghar: Applied Mathematics and Computation. (2004)
 Hall effects on unsteady duct flow of a non-Newtonian fluid in a porous medium. Tasawar Hayat, R. Naz, Saleem Asghar: Applied Mathematics and Computation 157(1): 103–114 (2004)
 Some exact solutions of an elastico-viscous fluid. Abdul Majeed Siddiqui, Tasawar Hayat, Saleem Asghar: Appl. Math. Lett.  (2001)

References

External links 

 

Living people
Academic staff of Quaid-i-Azam University
Quaid-i-Azam University alumni
1969 births
21st-century Pakistani mathematicians
Mathematics writers
Fellows of Pakistan Academy of Sciences
Recipients of Hilal-i-Imtiaz
Fellows of the African Academy of Sciences
Associate Fellows of the African Academy of Sciences